K League (Hangul: K리그) is South Korea's professional football league. It includes first division K League 1 and second division K League 2.

History 
Until the 1970s, South Korean football operated two major football leagues, the National Semi-professional Football League and the National University Football League, but these were not professional leagues in which footballers could focus on only football. In 1979, however, the Korea Football Association (KFA)'s president Choi Soon-young planned to found a professional football league, and made South Korea's first professional football club Hallelujah FC the next year. After the South Korean professional baseball league KBO League was founded in 1982, the KFA was aware of crisis about the popularity of football. In 1983, it urgently made the Korean Super League with two professional clubs (Hallelujah FC, Yukong Elephants) and three semi-professional clubs (POSCO Dolphins, Daewoo Royals, Kookmin Bank) to professionalize South Korean football. Then, the Super League accomplished its purpose after existing clubs were also converted into professional clubs (POSCO Atoms, Daewoo Royals) and new professional clubs joined the league. In the early years, it also showed a promotion system by giving qualifications to the Semi-professional League winners. (Hanil Bank in 1984, Sangmu FC in 1985)

However, the number of spectators was consistently decreased despite KFA's effort, and so the professional league, renamed as the Korean Professional Football League, operated home and away system to interest fans since 1987. On 30 July 1994, the Professional League Committee under KFA was independent of the association, and renamed as the "Korean Professional Football Federation". In 1996, South Korean government and the Football Federation introduced a decentralization policy to proliferate the popularity of football nationally in preparation for the 2002 FIFA World Cup, which they wanted to host. Several clubs located in the capital Seoul moved to other cities according to the new policy, but this was abolished after only three years and is regarded as a failed policy because it gave up the most populous city in South Korea. In 1998, the league was renamed again as current K League.

It had the current format by abolishing the K League Championship and the Korean League Cup after the 2011 season, and being split into two divisions in 2013. The first division's name was the K League Classic, and the second division's name was the K League Challenge at the time. The fact that both the first and the second divisions had very similar names caused some degree of confusion and controversy. Beginning with the 2018 season, both divisions were renamed the K League 1 and the K League 2 respectively.

On February 23, 2021, an OTT platform named "K League TV" officially began its service: born from a partnership between K League and their official relay operator abroad, Sportradar, the platform would guarantee access to users from almost the whole world (except for Korea), broadcast K League 1 and K League 2 matches in real time and host game highlights and interviews. K League TV also represented the first official portal to publish content about both the championships in English.

Structure 

Below the K League 1, there is the K League 2, and both form the K League as professional championships. Under them, there are two semi-professional leagues (K3 League, K4 League) and several amateur leagues, but their clubs cannot be promoted to K League.

However, since 2021 K League 1 and K League 2 teams have been allowed to create reserve teams set to play in the K4 League.

Promotion and Relegation between K League 2 and third tier K3 League starting from 2023 season after nine seasons did not feature promotion and relegation.

Clubs

Current clubs

K League 1

K League 2

All-time clubs 
As of 2023, there have been a total of 36 member clubs in the history of the K League – those clubs are listed below with their current names (where applicable):

 K League's principle of official statistics is that final club succeeds to predecessor club's history and records.
 Clubs in italics no longer exist.

Champions

Promotion-relegation playoffs 
The K League promotion-relegation playoffs were introduced in 2013 and are contested between the eleventh-placed team of the K League 1 and the runners-up of the K League 2. The first leg is always played at the second division team's home ground, while the second leg is played at the first division team's home ground.

Records and statistics 

K League officially includes records of K League 1, K League 2 and Korean League Cup in its statistics.

Restriction of foreign players 

At the inception of the K League in 1983, only two Brazilian players made rosters. At the time, rules allowed each club to have three foreign players and that the three could also play simultaneously in a game. From the 1996 season, each team had five foreign players among whom three could play in a game at the same time. Since 1999, foreign goalkeepers are banned from the league because South Korean clubs excessively employed foreign goalkeepers after watching Valeri Sarychev's performances at that time. In 2001 and 2002, the limit on foreign players was expanded seven but only three could play in a game at the same time. The limit was lower to five in 2003, four in 2005, and three in 2007. Since 2009, the number of foreign players went back up to four per team, including a slot for a player from AFC countries. Since 2020, Southeast Asian players can be registered under the ASEAN Quota.

Relocation of clubs 

In early years, the hometowns of K League clubs were determined, but they were pointless in substance because the clubs played all K League matches by going around all stadiums together. The current home and away system is being operated since 1987. The clubs were relocated from provinces to cities in 1990, but clubs are currently based in their area regardless of province and city since 1994. In 1996, the decentralization policy was operated. In result 3 clubs based in Seoul were relocated. Since 1996, it is obligatory for all clubs to include hometown name in their club name.

Awards

Annual awards 
 K League Most Valuable Player Award
 K League Top Scorer Award
 K League Top Assist Provider Award
 K League Young Player of the Year Award
 K League Manager of the Year Award
 K League Best XI
 K League FANtastic Player

Hall of Fame

Sponsorship

See also 
Football in South Korea
K League 1
K League 2
K League Championship
Korean League Cup
K League All-Star Game
Korean FA Cup
Korean Super Cup
List of K League licensed video games
South Korean football league system
South Korean football clubs in the AFC Champions League
R League

References

External links 

 Official K League website 

 
Professional sports leagues in South Korea